The 2016 Karnataka State Film Awards, presented by Government of Karnataka, felicitated the best of Karnataka cinema released in the year 2016. The list of winners were announced on 11 April 2017. The awards were presented on 24 April.

Lifetime achievement award
The jury committee for selecting the lifetime achievement awards was headed by actress Jayanthi.

Jury 
A committee headed by director Kavitha Lankesh was appointed to evaluate the awards. Other jury members were actress Rekha Rao, cinematographer Basavaraj, Director KN Vaidyanath and singer Chandrika Gururaj.

Film Awards

Other Awards

References

2016
2016 Indian film awards